Afrânio is a Brazilian municipality in the state of Pernambuco. It is the westernmost municipality of Pernambuco. It is located in the mesoregion of São Francisco Pernambucano . Afrânio has a total area of 1490.6 square kilometers and had an estimated population of 19,810 inhabitants in 2020 according with IBGE.

Geography

 State - Pernambuco
 Region - São Francisco Pernambucano
 Boundaries - Piaui state (N and W);  Bahia state (S); Petrolina and Dormentes  (E)
 Area - 1490.6 km2
 Elevation - 522 m / 1713 ft
 Hydrography - Pontal River
 Vegetation - Caatinga Hiperxerófila.
 Climate - Semi arid, ( Sertao) - hot and dry
 Yearly average temperature - 24.8 C
 Distance to Recife - 883 km

Economy

The main economic activities in Afrânio are based in general commerce and agribusiness, especially plantations of beans and corn; and creations of sheep, goats, donkeys and cattle.

Economic Indicators

Economy by Sector
2006

Health Indicators

References 

Municipalities in Pernambuco
Populated places established in 1963